Ashe Kilbourne, who performs under the name Kilbourne, is an electronic dance music DJ and producer based in New York. She plays hard techno and gabber, and also plays in grindcore bands. She started making music when she was a student at Wesleyan University in Connecticut and then joined the DJ collective kunq. In 2017, she played Bloodrave: Music From Blade, a re-imagined score for the film Blade.

References

Further reading
 
 

Year of birth missing (living people)
Wesleyan University alumni
American women in electronic music
Living people